Vítězslava Kaprálová (24 January 191516 June 1940) was a Czech composer and conductor of 20th-century classical music.

Life and career
Vítězslava Kaprálová was born in Brno, Austro-Hungarian Empire (now Czech Republic), a daughter of composer Václav Kaprál and singer Vítězslava Kaprálová (née Viktorie Uhlířová). From 1930-1935 she studied composition with Vilém Petrželka and conducting with Zdeněk Chalabala at the Brno Conservatory. She continued her musical education with Vítězslav Novák (1935–37) and Václav Talich (1935–36) in Prague and with Bohuslav Martinů, Charles Munch (1937–39) and, according to some unverified accounts, with Nadia Boulanger (1940) in Paris.  In 1937 she conducted the Czech Philharmonic and a year later the BBC Orchestra in her composition Military Sinfonietta. Her husband was the Czech writer Jiří Mucha, whom she married two months before she died. 

Despite her untimely death, possibly from typhoid fever misdiagnosed as miliary tuberculosis,  in Montpellier, France at the age of 25, Kaprálová created an impressive body of work.  Her music was admired by Rafael Kubelík, who premiered her orchestral song Waving Farewell and also conducted her other orchestral works.  Among the many interpreters of her piano music was pianist Rudolf Firkušný, for whom Kaprálová composed her best known piano work Dubnová preludia (April Preludes). In 1946, in appreciation of her distinctive contribution, the foremost academic institution in the country—the Czech Academy of Sciences and the Arts - awarded Kaprálová membership in memoriam. By 1948 this honour was bestowed on only 10 women, out of 648 members of the Academy.

The only English language monograph on the composer was published in 2011 by Lexington Books in the United States. The book also includes an annotated catalog of her works. 
Kaprálová was "Composer of the Week" on BBC Radio 3 from Monday 12 October to Friday 16 October 2015, a set of five one-hour programs playing her music and discussing her life.  
In 2021, Kapralova was among the 58 personalities featured by the exhibition Portraits de France, organized under the auspices of Emmanuel Macron in Paris, from December 1, 2021 to February 14, 2022. The 29 women and 29 men made the final cut from the original 318 nominees to be commemorated and celebrated for their contribution to the "national narrative of France."

Compositions
Kaprálová's catalogue includes her highly regarded art songs and music for piano solo, and a string quartet, a reed trio, music for cello, music for violin and piano, an orchestral cantata, two piano concertos, two orchestral suites, a sinfonietta, and a concertino for clarinet, violin, and orchestra. Much of her music was published during her lifetime and continues to be published today by various publishing houses, including Schott and Bärenreiter Verlag. In addition, her music has been released on record and compact disc by a variety of labels, including Chandos, Naxos, Koch International, Albany Records, Centaur Records, Delos Productions, Gramola, Claves Records, Supraphon, and others.

Legacy

Kapralova Society
Since 1998, Kaprálová's legacy has been promoted by the Kapralova Society, a non-profit music society based in Toronto, Ontario / Canada. The organization has been also seeking to redress the gender imbalance in music through public education, advocacy, and its Kapralova Society Journal, "a journal of women in music".

In popular culture
 Featured in Season 3, episodes 6 and 9, of the television series Mozart in the Jungle.
 Featured in The Glass Room by Simon Mawer

List of compositions
Selected works
 Suite en miniature, op. 1 for small orchestra 
 Two Compositions for Violin and Piano, op. 3
 Song cycle Two Songs, op. 4
 Song cycle Sparks from Ashes, op. 5
 January, for voice, flute, two violins, violoncello and piano
 Sonata Appassionata, op. 6 for piano
 Piano Concerto in D Minor, op. 7
 String Quartet, op. 8
 Grotesque Passacaglia for piano
 Three Piano Pieces, op. 9
 Song cycle Apple from the Lap, op. 10
 Sad Evening, for voice and orchestra
 Military Sinfonietta, op. 11 for large orchestra
 Song cycle Forever, op. 12
 April Preludes, op. 13 for piano
 Waving Farewell, op. 14 for voice and piano/orchestra
 Trio for Oboe, Clarinet, and Bassoon
 Ilena, op. 15. Cantata for soli, mixed choir, reciter and orchestra
 Variations sur le carillon de l'église St-Etienne du Mont, op. 16 for piano
 Two Choruses for Women's Voices a cappella, op. 17
 Elegy, for violin and piano
 Suita Rustica, op. 19 for orchestra
 Partita, op. 20 for piano and string orchestra 
 Concertino for Violin, Clarinet and Orchestra, op. 21
 Song cycle Sung into the Distance, op. 22
 Deux ritournelles, op. 25 for violoncello and piano

Selected discography
 La Vita: Leonie Karatas plays Vítězslava Kaprálová piano music, CD, EuroArts (2022)
 Orchestral Music (Prélude de Noël, Suite en miniature, Military Sinfonietta, Piano Concerto, orchestral songs Waving Farewell and Sad Evening) Kaprálová: Orchestral music, CD, Naxos 8.574144
 Orchestral Works (Piano Concerto, Suita rustica, Military Sinfonietta, Partita, Concertino) Kaprálová: Orchestral Works, CD, Radioservis CR0791-2
 Piano concerto and works for keyboard: Vítězslava Kaprálová, CD, Radioservis CRO577-2
 Complete piano music: Kaprálová: Complete piano music, CD, Naxos (Grand Piano) GP708
 Music for piano / piano and violin: Vítězslava Kaprálová, CD, Koch Records KIC-CD-7742
 Art songs: Forever Kaprálová: Songs, CD, Supraphon SU3752-2 231
 String quartet Kaprál-Kaprálová-Martinů, CD, Radioservis CRO618-2

Notes

References

Bibliography

Books

Gates, Eugene and Karla Hartl, eds. The Women in Music Anthology. Toronto: The Kapralova Society, 2021.
Hartl, Karla and Erik Entwistle, eds. The Kaprálová Companion. Lanham, MD: Lexington Books, 2011.

Articles

Armstrong, Asher Ian. "Ephemeral Incandescence: the April Preludes of Vítězslava Kaprálová." Kapralova Society Journal 21, no. 1 (Winter 2023): 1-4. 
Blalock, Marta. "Kaprálová's String Quartet, op. 8." Kapralova Society Journal 8, no. 1 (Spring 2010): 1-10. 
Cheek, Timothy. "Navždy (Forever) Kaprálová: Reevaluating Czech composer Vítězslava Kaprálová through her thirty songs." Kapralova Society Journal 3, no. 2 (Fall 2005): 1-6.
Cheek, Timothy. "Sad Evening, Great Discovery: Bringing to Light a New Song by Vítězslava Kaprálová" Kapralova Society Journal 12, no. 1 (Spring 2014): 1-7.
Egeling, Stephane. "Kaprálová’s Trio for oboe, clarinet and bassoon." Kapralova Society Journal 9, no. 2 (Fall 2011): 5-8.
Entwistle, Erik. "To je Julietta. Martinů, Kaprálová and Musical Symbolism." Kapralova Society Newsletter 2, no. 2 (Fall 2004): 1-15.
Fischer, Christine. "Ending Republican Gender Politics: Kaprálová's Cantata Ilena." Kapralova Society Journal 18, no. 2 (Summer 2020): 1–11.
Hartl, Karla. "Kaprálová as a Composer of the Week. The BBC Interview." Journal of Czech and Slovak Music 29 (2020): 204–221.
Hartl, Karla. "The Power of Advocacy in Music: The Case of Vítězslava Kaprálová." Journal of Czech and Slovak Music 27 (2018): 4–32.
Hartl, Karla. "Vítězslava Kaprálová: Thematic Catalogue of the Works. An Introduction." Kapralova Society Journal 21, no. 1 (Winter 2023): 5–11.
Houtchens, Alan. "Love's Labour's Lost: Martinů, Kaprálová and Hitler." In Irish Musical Studies 4, pp. 127–132. Edited by Patrick F. Devine & Harry White. Dublin: Four Courts Press, 1996. 
Jandura, Tereza. "Kaprálová’s Jablko s klína, op. 10." Kapralova Society Journal 9, no. 1 (Spring 2011): 1-11. 
Kostaš, Martin. "An Analysis of Compositional Methods Applied in Kaprálová’s Cantata Ilena, op. 15." Kapralova Society Journal 10, no. 1 (Spring 2012): 1–6.
Koukl, Giorgio. "Vítězslava Kaprálová: Two Dances for Piano, op. 23 (1940). An attempt at reconstruction of the autograph."  Kapralova Society Journal 18, no. 1 (Winter 2020): 8–12.
Latour, Michelle. "Kaprálová’s song Leden." Kapralova Society Journal 9, no. 1 (2011): 1-4.
Latour, Michelle. "Kaprálová’s Vteřiny, op. 18." Kapralova Society Journal 10, no. 1 (Spring 2012): 7–10.
Paige, Diane M. "Kaprálová and the Muses: Understanding the Qualified Composer." Kapralova Society Journal 10, no. 2 (Fall 2012): 1–6.
Svatos, Thomas D. "On the Literary Reception of Kaprálová and Martinů: Jiří Mucha's Peculiar Loves and Miroslav Barvík's 'At Tři Studně.'" Zwischentöne 2 (2017): 71-90. 
Vejvarová, Michaela. "Vítězslava Kaprálová's Last Concertino." Czech Music 4 (2001): 6-7.

Dissertations and Master's theses

Blalock, Marta. Analysis and performance problems of Vítězslava Kaprálová’s String quartet, op. 8 (1935-1936). DMA dissertation. University of Georgia, 2008.
Jandura, Tereza. Her Own Voice: The Art Songs of Vítězslava Kaprálová. DMA dissertation. University of Arizona, 2009.
Lytle, Rebecca. An Analysis of Selected Works of Vítězslava Kaprálová. Master's thesis, University of Texas at El Paso, 2008.

External links
Kapralova Society official website of the composer, maintained by the Kapralova Society in Toronto, Canada.
Composer of the Week: Vitezslava Kapralova - a digest of the five-hour radio documentary on Kaprálová from BBC Radio 3.
The In Concert Revival Hour: Vítězslava Kaprálová - a 68-minute radio documentary on Kaprálová from CBC Radio 2. 

1915 births
1940 deaths
20th-century classical composers
20th-century women composers
20th-century conductors (music)
Composers for piano
Czech classical composers
Czech conductors (music)
Czechoslovak expatriates in France
Women classical composers
École Normale de Musique de Paris alumni
Prague Conservatory alumni
Brno Conservatory alumni
Musicians from Brno
People from the Margraviate of Moravia
Women conductors (music)